Aneliopis is a genus of moths of the family Erebidae. The genus was erected by George Thomas Bethune-Baker in 1908. All the species are known from New Guinea.

Species
Aneliopis adelpha Bethune-Baker, 1908
Aneliopis alampeta Bethune-Baker, 1908
Aneliopis albipuncta Bethune-Baker, 1908
Aneliopis trilineata Bethune-Baker, 1908

References

Hypeninae
Noctuoidea genera